Bradley James Pyatt (born April 16, 1980 in Arvada, Colorado) is a former American football wide receiver who played in the National Football League and Arena Football League. He was signed by the Indianapolis Colts as an undrafted free agent in 2003. He also played college football at Kentucky and Northern Colorado.

Football career

High school 

Pyatt is an Arvada West High School graduate and played for long-time high school coaching legend Dave Logan on the Wildcats’ Class 5A 1997 state championship team. He was a two-time high school All-American, two-time All-Colorado and All-State selection in 1996 and 1997. He was among the most-sought wide receivers in the country, recruited by over 50 colleges, led by: Southern California, Miami, Colorado, Kentucky, Michigan State, and Arizona.

College 

Pyatt played at University of Kentucky and University of Northern Colorado after graduating high school despite having scholarship offers from Southern California and Miami. After 3 years with the Kentucky Wildcats and multiple injuries, Pyatt transferred to University of Northern Colorado in 2002.

National Football League

Indianapolis Colts 

Pyatt was signed by the National Football League’s (NFL) Indianapolis Colts as a free agent on July 16, 2003, and then played for three seasons in the NFL as the Colts' wide receiver.  He returned 19 kickoffs for 544 yards - a 28.6 yard-per-return average - and 12 punts for 110 yards, an average of 9.2 yards per return over his first eight games.

Some of his accomplishments include a 38-yard kickoff return versus the Tennessee Titans on September 14, 2003, and a 50-yard kickoff return against the New Orleans Saints on September 28, 2003.  One of the highlights of his playing career is his 90-yard kickoff return versus the Tampa Bay Buccaneers on October 6, 2003. The Colts recovered from the 21-point deficit at less than four minutes remaining, and won this comeback 38-35 when the play set up a touchdown during overtime. This comeback is considered the third best in NFL to-date by experts and analysts.

Other NFL Teams 

Pyatt’s NFL career also included playing for the St. Louis Rams, Miami Dolphins, and Pittsburgh Steelers. In 2007, he joined the Colorado Crush as part of the Arena Football League for 2 years. He retired from playing pro-football in 2008.

Career Statistics 
Pyatt's professional football career spanned from 2003 to 2008 with the Indianapolis Colts and Colorado Crush. Over his professional career he caught 165 passes for 1,859 yards and 31 receiving touchdowns, (of which 3 receptions and 14 receiving yards were in the NFL).

Coaching career 

In February 2014, Pyatt became the head football coach of his alma mater high school, Arvada West High School in Arvada, CO. He is the school’s seventh coach in 50 years.

Pyatt played for legendary Arvada West coach Dave Logan and has revived Logan’s coaching philosophies to train his team with the traditions and legacies of previous teams from the late 1990s.

As a coach, Pyatt draws from his experience as a player in the NFL and AFL where he played for Pro Football Hall of Fame coach Tony Dungy, quarterback Peyton Manning, General Manager Bill Polian of the Indianapolis Colts, and Pro Football Hall of Fame quarterback and Colorado Crush owner, John Elway. Pyatt specifically credits Manning and Dungy with teaching him about leadership, preparation, and how to treat people on and off the field.

Business career

MusclePharm 

After his career in the NFL, Pyatt, along with friend Cory Gregory, founded the MusclePharm Corporation, a nutritional supplement company, where Pyatt served as CEO from 2008 to 2016.

With the help of doctors, recognized worldwide in terms of sports nutrition and diet, Pyatt and Gregory molded a new sports nutrition product. Pyatt assembled a team of scientists, two full-time PhDs, one full-time physician, and a scientific advisory board including Chief Scientific Director Dr. Roscoe Moore, who is a former assistant U.S. Surgeon General.  Pyatt parlayed his experience from the NFL not only to lead MusclePharm on a daily basis, but also to contribute to daily operations. As a result, Pyatt built MusclePharm into one of the biggest sports nutritional supplement brands worldwide.

In 2010, Pyatt took MusclePharm from a private company to become publicly traded. Pyatt oversaw the transition from public to private company by improving the company’s balance sheets and executing a number of complex financial transactions that won more favorable financing terms and significantly improved cash flow. Pyatt attracted billionaire Dr. Phil Frost to invest in MusclePharm. Under Pyatt's leadership, MusclePharm grew revenue from $1 million in 2009 to $50 million in 2012 and in 2015, they exceeded $170 million.

Pyatt focused MusclePharm’s advertising budget on endorsements from top professional athletes. He sought and succeeded at landing MusclePharm many high-profile athlete endorsements, helping advance the company’s name recognition and sales, including Arnold Schwarzenegger, Tiger Woods, and NFL quarterback Colin Kaepernick.

Under Pyatt’s direction, MusclePharm also became the official nutrition company of the Ultimate Fighting Championship (UFC), Major League Baseball’s Cincinnati Reds, European soccer’s Manchester City and other professional sports teams and organizations.

Pyatt also lead MusclePharm's partnerships with major retailers including: Wal-Mart, Costco, Target, GNC, Vitamin Shoppe, Vitamin World, Dick’s Sporting Goods, Amazon and BodyBuilding.com.

Understanding the need for safety due to his own experience with supplements, Pyatt sought and secured approval from the U.S. Sports Academy for safety and effectiveness following an extensive clinical trial for MusclePharm’s Assault line of products.

On September 8, 2015 the SEC charged MusclePharm and four individuals, including Pyatt, with committing a series of accounting and disclosure violations. The SEC's investigation found that MusclePharm omitted or understated nearly a half-million dollars’ worth of perks bestowed upon its executives, including approximately $244,000 paid to CEO Brad Pyatt related to automobiles, apparel, meals, golf club memberships, and his personal tax and legal services. MusclePharm and the four individuals settled the cases without admitting or denying the SEC’s findings.  MusclePharm agreed to pay a $700,000 penalty and hire an independent monitor for one year among other undertakings.  Pyatt agreed to pay a $150,000 penalty.

After serving as MusclePharm’s president and CEO for 8 years, Pyatt resigned from the company in March 2016. His severance included $1.1 million cash.

References

1980 births
Living people
American football wide receivers
Kentucky Wildcats football players
Northern Colorado Bears football players
Indianapolis Colts players
Miami Dolphins players
Pittsburgh Steelers players
Colorado Crush players
People from Arvada, Colorado